Roy Trevor Holder (15 June 1946 – 9 November 2021) was an English film and television actor who appeared in various programmes including Ace of Wands, Z-Cars, Spearhead, the Doctor Who serial The Caves of Androzani. His first notable appearance on the screen was in the 1961 film Whistle Down the Wind and he then appeared in Franco Zeffirelli's The Taming of the Shrew (1967), and Here We Go Round the Mulberry Bush (1967).

Career
In 1968 he played Peter in Zeffirelli's Romeo and Juliet. Appearances in The Virgin Soldiers (1969), Loot (1970), The Virgin and the Gypsy (1970), Psychomania (1973), The Land That Time Forgot (1974), and Trial by Combat (1976) followed, and he worked with Zeffirelli for a third time in the Jesus of Nazareth miniseries in 1977. He also played the recurring role of Frank Baker in the BBC TV series Sorry! from 1981 to 1988.

Holder also appeared as Mr Callard in "Precious Bane", as Mickey Lister in Coronation Street, and a photographer in Steptoe and Son. He played Nick the taxi driver in EastEnders (2000), as well as the part of Mr. Hill in Pride & Prejudice (2005) and Gaffer Tom in Robin Hood (2010).

Holder returned to film in 2011 as Fred Goddard in War Horse; and made a return to television in 2018, featuring in Dark Heart.

Personal life
Holder played in several celebrity golf tournaments throughout the year for The Stage Golfing Society.

In 2016, after they had been together for more than 40 years, Holder married Pauline Cox, a BBC makeup and hair designer whom he had met when they were working on the play Brent Geese in 1975. They had two children, Kate and Thomas.

Death
Holder died on 9 November 2021, at the age of 75.

Filmography

References

External links

Roy Holder at Theatricalia

1946 births
2021 deaths
English male television actors
People from Birmingham, West Midlands